Hop Kee is a basement restaurant in Chinatown, Manhattan, opened in 1968, described as “the cornerstone of a legendary block of Mott Street.”

When restaurants in New York City were allowed to open in the early days of Covid, they were takeout and cash only. 

Hop Kee appeared on Season 12, Episode 7 of Anthony Bourdain: Parts Unknown and was one of his five favorite “under the radar” NYC restaurants.

References

External links
Hop Kee Chinese Restaurant, Delicious Snails in Chinatown New York City
Anthony Bourdain’s Guide to Disappearing New York
Chris Cheung Reveals More About the ‘Phantom Menus’ of Chinatown

Chinese restaurants in New York (state)
Chinatown, Manhattan